Buhača (or Buvača) is a village in central Croatia, in the municipality of Cetingrad, Karlovac County. It is connected by the D216 highway.

History 
The Eastern Orthodox church of the Holy Apostles Peter and Paul, built in the Byzantine style in 1800. In the World War II, the temple devastated and looted by the Ustashas. After the war it was repaired. The church is situated on small hill above Maljevac settlement and is very visible from the main road connecting Velika Kladuša and Vojnić. The roof of the church is in terrible condition. The parochy includes Maljevac, Maljevačko Selište, Buhača, Cetingrad, Vališ Selo and Grabarska in neighboring Bosnia.

Until 1991, the village was part of the settlement of Maljevac in the municipality of Slunj. It is an independent settlement since 2001.

Demographics
According to the 2011 census, the village of Buhača has 36 inhabitants. 

{{Kretanje broja stanovnika
 |naslov  = 'Historical population 1857-2011Naselja i stanovništvo Republike Hrvatske 1857-2001, www.dzs.hr
 |dimx    = 550
 |dimy    = 
 |stanmax = 800
 |crta1   = 100
 |crta2   = 50
 |a1      = 1857
 |a2      = 1869
 |a3      = 1880
 |a4      = 1890
 |a5      = 1900
 |a6      = 1910
 |a7      = 1921
 |a8      = 1931
 |a9      = 1948
 |a10     = 1953
 |a11     = 1961
 |a12     = 1971
 |a13     = 1981
 |a14     = 1991
 |a15     = 2001
 |a16     = 2011
 |p1      = 743
 |p2      = 787
 |p3      = 730
 |p4      = 279
 |p5      = 598
 |p6      = 0
 |p7      = 0
 |p8      = 0
 |p9      = 124
 |p10     = 155
 |p11     = 76
 |p12     = 111
 |p13     = 0
 |p14     = 0
 |p15     = 29
 |p16     = 36
 |izvor   = Croatian Bureau of Statistics
 }}

 

Notable natives and residents 
 Milan Vujaklija ((1891–1955) - a linguist, writer and translator, the author of the Dictionary of Foreign Words and Expressions''

References 

Populated places in Karlovac County
Serb communities in Croatia